The Glisenti Model 1910 was a 9 mm calibre semi-automatic service pistol produced by the Italian company Società Siderurgica Glisenti. It was put in production in 1910 to replace the aging Bodeo Model 1889. It saw extensive service in World War I and World War II with the Royal Italian Army. The Model 1910 has a complex and weak firing system which mandates that the pistol ought to use weaker cartridges than pistols of comparable calibre.

History

Development
The creation of a service pistol to supplant the Bodeo Model 1889 began to be rumored in late 1903. The pistol was designed by Italian inventor Bethel Abiel Revelli. Revelli spent multiple years developing a prototype before patenting his design to Società Siderurgica Glisenti of Turin. The Glisenti company acquired the machinery to begin production from the United Kingdom in 1906 but sold the manufacturing rights to Metallurgica Brescia già Tempini.

Original design
The Glisenti Model 1910 was originally designed to fire a 7.65×22mm bottle-neck cartridge.  The pistol being known as the Model 1906 began production in 1908. The Model 1906 failed to impress the Royal Italian Army and was requested to fire a round similar to the German 9×19mm Parabellum. The redesign was named the Model 1910 and was formally adopted by the Royal Italian Army. To reduce recoil and because of the pistol's weak design, the Model 1910 had to fire the 9mm Glisenti. The 9 mm Glisenti is structurally similar to the 9×19 mm Parabellum but has a reduced velocity.

Description
The Model 1910 fires from a locked breech. When fired, the barrel and bolt recoil together. The barrel will stop in a rearward position. The bolt, unlocking itself, will then continue forward, stripping the chamber and driving the barrel forward again. After this action, a wedge will rise from the frame and lock the entire frame back into position. This firing system was not strong and had to fire cartridges weaker than the comparable 9×19mm Parabellum calibre. The screw at the front of the frame, when undone will allow the removal of a plate on the left side of the pistol granting access to the moving parts within the pistol. This design was not stiff enough to sufficiently support the left side of the barrel extension and after prolonged firing, the left plate was prone to loosening. The only safety on the pistol was a small lever set in front of the grip.

Replacement 
Metallurgica Brescia già Tempini in 1912 attempted to improve the design of the Model 1910. The improved pistol, referred to as the Brixia, was submitted to the Royal Italian Army for approval. The Brixia had a strengthened frame and removed the grip safety but was not a big enough improvement to make a change in the Royal Italian Army. The Brixia was later to be sold to the civilian market but the outbreak of World War I led to the cancellation of the project.
 
The Glisenti remained in production until the early 1920s. In increasing numbers from 1916 onward, the Glisenti began to be phased out by the Spanish produced Ruby pistol and Beretta M1915. The Beretta later became the official service pistol in the Royal Italian Army in 1934. The Glisenti was declared obsolete the same year but saw limited service in World War II.

References

Sources
 
 
 
 
 

9mm Glisenti firearms
Early semi-automatic pistols
Semi-automatic pistols of Italy
World War I Italian infantry weapons
World War II infantry weapons of Italy